Stevan Stojanović (born 29 October 1964) is a retired Serbian football goalkeeper best known for captaining Red Star Belgrade side which won the 1991 European Cup Final.

Club career
He came through Red Star's youth ranks. He spent a couple of seasons as a substitute to Yugoslav internationals like Tomislav Ivković and Živan Ljukovčan before debuting in the 1986-87 season. He participated in Red Star's 4–2 win over Real Madrid in European Cup quarter-finals and stopped a Hugo Sanchez's penalty kick in Belgrade. He quickly became a fans' favourite and was nicknamed Mali Dika (Little Dika) or Mladi Dika (Young Dika) after Red Star's goalkeeper from late seventies and early eighties, Aleksandar Stojanović (no family relationship to another Dika). He won his first Yugoslav title with Red Star in the 1987-88 season and repeated it by winning a national double in 1989-90. A few days before a crucial 1/8 finals UEFA Cup against 1. FC Köln, Stojanović broke his arm during practice. Although Red Star had a comfortable 2–0 advantage from the first match in Belgrade (in which Stojanović was the best player alongside Dejan Savićević), the side fell apart at Müngersdorfer Stadion and conceded two late goals before losing 3–2 on aggregate.

After the departure of Red Star's captain Dragan Stojković in the summer of 1990, Stojanović was voted team captain and led his team mates to Red Star's first and only European Cup title in 1990–91. He missed only one game and bailed out his team mates on many occasions during the campaign. In a nerve-wracking semi-final against Bayern Munich he conceded a memorable goal from Klaus Augenthaler right through the legs, which turned the momentum in Bayern's favour. However, he blocked several difficult shots before Augenthaler scored an infamous own goal in injury time, which sent Red Star to Bari, to participate in the finals against Olympique de Marseille. Again, there was no glamour from Red Star's Savićević or Prosinečki, it was Stojanović who stole the show during 120 minutes and especially in the penalty shootout, when he stopped Manuel Amoros's shot, which resulted in Red Star Belgrade triumphing 5–3 on penalties. Stojanović also became the first goalkeeper to captain a Champions' Cup winning team.

Later he played for Belgium's Royal Antwerp and made an appearance at the 1993 European Cup Winners' Cup Final against Parma AC.

International career
He was called up several times for Yugoslavia national football team, but was not chosen for a competitive A team game. He played for Under 21 and Olympic teams.

Personal life
His son, Marko, is also a footballer.

Honours
Red Star Belgrade
Yugoslav First League: 1987–88, 1989–90, 1990–91
Yugoslav Cup: 1989–90
European Cup: 1990–91

Royal Antwerp
Belgian Cup: 1991–92
UEFA Cup Winners' Cup: 1992-93 (runners-up)

References

External links
Profile at Royal Antwerp
Tapi mi je nudio veliki novac da primim gol u Bariju, Blic, 31 May 2009

1964 births
Living people
Sportspeople from Mitrovica, Kosovo
Kosovo Serbs
Yugoslav footballers
Yugoslav expatriate footballers
Serbian footballers
Serbia and Montenegro expatriate footballers
Serbia and Montenegro footballers
Association football goalkeepers
Yugoslav First League players
Belgian Pro League players
Red Star Belgrade footballers
Royal Antwerp F.C. players
Expatriate footballers in Belgium
Expatriate footballers in Germany
Expatriate footballers in Greece
Olympic footballers of Yugoslavia
Footballers at the 1988 Summer Olympics
Serbian sports executives and administrators
Yugoslav expatriate sportspeople in Belgium
Serbia and Montenegro expatriate sportspeople in Belgium
Serbia and Montenegro expatriate sportspeople in Germany
Serbia and Montenegro expatriate sportspeople in Greece
Ethnikos Asteras F.C. players